Jonathan Kaplan (born 1947) is an American film producer and director.

Jonathan Kaplan may also refer to:

 Jonathan Kaplan (rugby union) (born 1966), rugby union referee
 Jonathan Kaplan (writer) (born 1956), South Africa-born medical doctor and writer
Jonathan E. Kaplan, technology entrepreneur

See also
 Jon Kaplan (disambiguation)
 John Kaplan (disambiguation)